Best of Wildside is a 71 minute New Zealand compilation album featuring artists under the record label, Wildside Records, released in 1999. It appeared in the New Zealand's top ten compilation albums charts for eight weeks between 29 August and 17 October 1999, peaking at #3.

Track listing
"La La Land" - Shihad
"Wet Rubber" - Head like a Hole
"Don't Wanna Know" - Muckhole
"Bullet in my Hand" - Slim
"Got the Ju" - Weta
"Interconnector" - Shihad
"Nark" - Pumpkinhead
"I Wanna Know" - Dead Flowers
"I'm On Fire" - Head Like a Hole
"Surf to Hell" - SML
"Picasso Core" - Hallelujah Picassos
"Cool Guy" - Muckhole
"Faster Hooves" - Head Like a Hole
"Bitter" - Shihad
"Shovel" - Future Stupid
"Fish Across Face" - Head Like a Hole
"Pave it Over" - The Bilge Festival
"Rewind" - Hallelujah Picassos
"Plastic" - Dead Flowers
"Smiley Hands" - Breathe
"Right Now" - Bailterspace

References

Compilation albums by New Zealand artists
Record label compilation albums
1999 greatest hits albums